Frankie Drake Mysteries is a Canadian drama that ran on CBC from November 6, 2017 to March 8, 2021. The series starred Lauren Lee Smith and Chantel Riley as Frankie Drake and her partner Trudy who ran an all female private detective service in Toronto, Ontario, Canada in the 1920s.

Overview 
Lauren Lee Smith portrays the fictional Frankie Drake, the first female private detective in 1920s Toronto, with Chantel Riley as her crime solving partner Trudy Clarke. Frankie and Trudy are often assisted on their cases by Mary Shaw (Rebecca Liddiard), a morality officer in Toronto's police force and Flo Chakowitz (Sharron Matthews), a morgue attendant at the Toronto City Morgue.

Cast and characters

Main 

 Lauren Lee Smith as Frankie Drake, Toronto's first female private detective and the owner of Drake Private Detectives
 Chantel Riley as Trudy Clarke, Frankie's partner and friend 
 Rebecca Liddiard as Mary Shaw, a morality officer in Toronto's police force who often helps Frankie with her cases
 Sharron Matthews as Flo Chakowitz, a morgue attendant at the Toronto City Morgue who provides information to Frankie

Recurring 

 Wendy Crewson as Nora Amory, Frankie's mother, a con artist
 Karen Robinson (seasons 1-3; guest season 4) as Mildred Clarke, Trudy's mother, a good Christian woman who is not afraid to speak her mind when needed
 Grace Lynn Kung (seasons 1–3) as Wendy Quon, the owner of Quon's Cafe, a speakeasy in the Ward that is frequented by the main cast
 Romaine Waite as Bill Peters a friend of Trudy's who works at city hall and helps the women out with information at times. At the beginning of season four, was engaged to Trudy. He had a job offer in Ottawa, which caused Trudy to break off the engagement
 Emmanuel Kabongo as Moses Page (seasons 1 & 3), Frankie's boxing instructor with whom she has a casual romantic relationship
 Steve Lund as Ernest Hemingway (season 1), a writer and reporter for the Toronto Star
 Richard Walters (seasons 1–3) as Tickles Malone, a musician who Frankie bumps into at different clubs around Toronto
 Anthony Lemke as Detective Grayson (season 2), recently transferred to the Toronto police and a thorn in Frankie's investigations
 Johnathan Sousa as Alessandro Contento (season 4), a European race car driver who is Frankie's boyfriend
 Ben Sanders as Steven Reid (season 4), a journalist for the Worker's Gazette and Mary's boyfriend
 Patrick Garrow as Harvey Lyle (season 4), a detective in Mary's precinct, who suspects Mary is smarter than she lets on and tries to catch her snooping
 Mac Fyfe as Sebastian West (season 4), Frankie's neighbour, a carpenter, who has a passing interest in Frankie

Guest
 Jonny Harris as George Crabtree (season 1), who has retired from the Toronto police and was a successful investor
 Derek McGrath as Abraham Amory (season 1)
 Romane Portail as Coco Chanel (season 2), who hires Frankie to determine who shot at her in Toronto
 Honeysuckle Weeks as Agatha Christie (season 3), whom Frankie meets in England
 Dillon Casey as Jack Drake (seasons 3 & 4), Frankie's younger half brother
 Geraint Wyn Davies as Ned Drake (season 4), Frankie's dead father, who she discovers is alive and well

Episodes

Series overview

Season 1 (2017–2018)

Season 2 (2018)

Season 3 (2019)

Season 4 (2021)

Production 
The series was created by Carol Hay and Michelle Ricci; both women also served as writers and producers on Murdoch Mysteries. It is produced by Shaftesbury Films.  

On April 5, 2018, the show was renewed for a second season. On March 25, 2019, the show was renewed for a third season. The third season premiere was filmed in England, with Honeysuckle Weeks playing the role of British author Agatha Christie.  On May 27, 2020, Frankie Drake Mysteries was renewed by CBC for a fourth season. On February 28, 2021, CBC announced the show would not be renewed for a fifth season.

In May 2020, an animated spinoff for kids called Mary and Flo: On the Go was reported as being in production; the web series was released in March 2022.

Broadcast 

Alibi in the United Kingdom aired the second season starting January 21, 2019, with the third season aired in 2020. Ovation in the United States aired seasons one and two back to back, beginning on June 15, 2019, and started airing season three on April 4, 2020. The fourth and final season premiered on October 2, 2021, following the broadcast of the new special titled Frankie Drake Mysteries: Music at Midnight, and the series concluded on December 4, 2021. Co-produced by Ovation in conjunction with the Toronto Sympathy Orchestra and Shaftesbury Films, this special features interviews and performances from series stars Chantel Riley, Sharron Matthews, and more. The special wasn't aired in Canada, instead released onto YouTube by Shaftsbury on their channel earlier in February 2021, and premiered on Ovation on September 25, 2021 at 7PM ET/4PM PT. Additionally, PBS has started broadcasting the show and offering it on-demand through its membership program, Passport. The show was further picked up in Europe, Australia, and New Zealand.

Home media

Reception 
The series has received generally positive reviews from critics since its release. John Doyle of The Globe and Mail remarked "it's a hoot and as silly as all get-out," and concluded that "thanks to its charm and the frocks, skirts, suits and, well, the gorgeous furniture, it's frightfully good entertainment." Johanna Schneller of the Toronto Star wrote that "the messaging in CBC series sometimes hits you over the head, but it's fun to watch women run their own show."

Notes

References

External links
 Frankie Drake Mysteries at CBC.ca

CBC Television original programming
2010s Canadian crime drama television series
2017 Canadian television series debuts
Cultural depictions of Grand Duchess Anastasia Nikolaevna of Russia
Television series by Shaftesbury Films
Television series set in the 1920s
Television shows set in Toronto
2020s Canadian crime drama television series
2021 Canadian television series endings
Canadian historical television series